Morgan Llwyd (1619 – 3 June 1659) was a Puritan Fifth Monarchist and Welsh language poet and prose author.

Biography 
Morgan Llwyd was born to a cultured and influential family in the parish of Maentwrog, Gwynedd. His grandfather, Huw Llwyd, was a professional soldier and noted Welsh language poet, and also had a reputation as an astrologer and magician.

Morgan Llwyd was educated in Wrexham, where he experienced a religious awakening under the Puritan preacher, Walter Cradock, whom he followed to Llanfaches to be part of a Puritan church. During the English Civil War, he served as a chaplain in Oliver Cromwell's New Model Army, and in 1644 he returned to Wales, first as a preacher, and in 1650 as an Approver under the Act for the Propagation of the Gospel in Wales. In 1656 he settled as a minister in Wrexham, where he died in 1659, and is buried in the Dissenters' Burial Ground in Rhosddu.

Morgan Llwyd is credited with being the first Nonconformist minister in Wrexham. Ysgol Morgan Llwyd, the Welsh-medium high school in Wrexham, is named after him.

Work 
Morgan Llwyd was the author of seven prose works in Welsh and English, a considerable body of poetry, and translations of passages from the work of Jakob Bóhme, taken from the English-language translations of John Sparrow. His most significant prose work is Llyfr y Tri Aderyn, or The Book of The Three Birds, comprising a religious and political debate between a Raven, representing the High Church Anglican and Royalist faction under Cromwell's Commonwealth, an Eagle, representing its government, and a Dove, representing the Puritan faction, who convinces the Eagle of the truth of Puritan teaching and the validity of theocracy. In addition to this, the Raven and the Dove are compared with the Raven and Dove sent out from Noah's Ark to search for dry land, and history is represented as a hiatus between the divine judgement given in the Genesis flood narrative, and the Last Judgement, which Morgan Llwyd expects very shortly.

Morgan Llwyd's three shorter Welsh-language prose works are Llythyr i'r Cymry Cariadus, Gwaedd yng Nghymru yn Wyneb pob Cynwybod, and Cyfarwydd i'r Cymru, in which he stresses the urgent need of his readers for a personal reconciliation with God. Of his three English-language tracts, Lazarus and His Sisters Discoursing of Paradise and Where is Christ? deal with theological matters, while An Honest Discourse Between Three Neighbours explores differing attitudes to Oliver Cromwell's rule.

Critical response 
In an interview with Saunders Lewis, the short-story writer John Gwilym Jones speaks of his 'immense' artistic debt to Llythyr i'r Cymry Cariadus and Llyfr y Tri Aderyn, whose style he studied closely and sought to imitate, while M. Wynn Thomas, in his monograph, Morgan Llwyd, explores the poetic and imaginative richness of his prose as a tool for expressing his intensely mystical religious vision. For Gwynfor Evans, Morgan Llwyd is a 'Welsh nation builder', historically significant as a proponent of Puritanism in specifically Welsh cultural terms, and as a contributor to a modern Welsh national consciousness. Hugh Bevan considers his importance as a Puritan and writer in Morgan Llwyd y Llenor, while a book by Goronwy Owen, Rhwng Calfin a Böhme: Golwg ar Syniadaeth Morgan Llwyd, explores his theological and mystical ideas. Llyfr y Tri Aderyn was translated into English by L.J. Parry for the National Eisteddfod in 1896, and by Rob Mimpriss as A Book of Three Birds (Cockatrice Books, 2017).

References 
 Hugh Bevan, Morgan Llwyd y Llenor. Cardiff: University of Wales Press, 1954. 
 Gwynfor Evans, Welsh Nation Builders. Llandysul: Gwasg Gomer, 1988. .
 John Gwilym Jones, 'The Craft of the Short Story.' The Plum Tree and Other Short Prose. Translated by Meic Stephens. Bridgend: Seren, 2004. .
 Morgan Llwyd, A Book of Three Birds. Edited and translated by Rob Mimpriss. Cockatrice Books, 2017. .
 Morgan Llwyd, Llyfr y Tri Aderyn: Allan o Argraffiad Urdd y Graddedigion o weithiau Morgan Llwyd. Cardiff: University of Wales Press, 1974. .
 Morgan Llwyd, Ysgrifeniadau Morgan Llwyd. Edited by P.J. Donovan. Cardiff: University of Wales Press/Yr Academi Gymreig, 1985. .
 Goronwy Wyn Owen, Rhwng Calfin a Böhme: Golwg ar Syniadaeth Morgan Llwyd. Cardiff: University of Wales Press, 2001. . 
 L.J. Parry, 'The Book of the Three Birds.' Transactions of the National Eisteddfod of Wales, Llandudno, 1896. Edited by E. Vincent Evans. Liverpool: I. Foulkes/National Eisteddfod Association, 1896.
 Meic Stephens, The Oxford Companion to the Literature of Wales. Oxford: Oxford University Press/Yr Academi Gymreig, 1986. .
 M Wynn Thomas, Morgan Llwyd. Cardiff: University of Wales Press, 1984. .

External links 

 Ysgol Morgan Llwyd, Wrecsam

1619 births
1659 deaths
Arminian writers
Arminian ministers
Welsh-language writers
Welsh-language poets
17th-century Welsh writers
17th-century male writers
People from Gwynedd
People from Wrexham
Welsh Puritans